"Helena" (sometimes titled "Helena (So Long & Goodnight)" on digital retailers such as iTunes) is a song by American rock band My Chemical Romance from their second studio album Three Cheers for Sweet Revenge (2004). It was released to radio stations as the third single from the album on March 8, 2005. The song is featured on the soundtrack for the 2005 film remake entitled House of Wax and played during the full credits. The song was heavily inspired by the Misfits' "Helena".

Reception
"Helena" was released to radio on March 8, 2005. The single has become a moderately-selling hit, both in the US and internationally. Way stated in an interview with Channel V that the main influence behind "Helena" was from the song "Aces High" by Iron Maiden and tracks by The Ventures. This song is also My Chemical Romance's sixth overall single. Way described it as representing the band's image and sound, and as such it was often used to end the band's shows. The single was certified as a Gold record in United States. Despite charting lower than their prior hit, "I'm Not Okay (I Promise)" on the Billboard Modern Rock Tracks chart peaking at number four where "Helena" peaked at number 11, "Helena" was the band's first crossover hit crossing over to Top 40 radio at number 33 on the Billboard Hot 100 chart and it also still had more airplay on alternative rock stations.

NME declared that the song was one of the "20 Greatest Goth Tracks" and that it was "a pivotal moment in cross-fertilising goth with emo" and that "MCR spawned a hybrid that ensured black clothes and eyeliner became, once again, teenage rebellion's default setting". Variety ranked it as one of the best emo songs of all time in 2022.

Music video
The music video was shot on-location in the Immanuel Presbyterian Church on Wilshire Boulevard in Los Angeles, California, directed by Marc Webb, and choreographed by Michael Rooney. The video has a simple plot, with Gerard Way as a very emotional mourner at a funeral where the band is performing. There are also mourners who dance and mourn the death of Helena. Near the end, the dead body of Helena (played by actress and dancer Tracy Phillips, daughter of NFL coach Wade Phillips) rises and dances down the nave representing crossing over into the afterlife. After she falls back into the casket, the pallbearers (also played by My Chemical Romance and a fan named Cameron) carry the casket to the hearse (in the pouring rain), surrounded by a phalanx of dancing men and women with umbrellas.

Though the song in general is about the band members Gerard Way and Mikey Way's late grandmother, it was stated in an interview that the video told a different story. The music video shows the funeral of a girl, who, according to Gerard Way, died tragically (possibly in a car crash, with the line in the bridge of the song, "When both our cars collide." Which also has links to the final track on I Brought You My Bullets, You Brought Me Your Love which follows the story of the Demolition Lovers who are travelling in car “And I would drive on to the end with you” which the story also follows in Three Cheers for Sweet Revenge.) The sixth pallbearer and the majority of the mourners are fans who'd received emails from the band asking if they'd like to be in the video.

During the "Making of..." video, found as a bonus on the Life on the Murder Scene CD and DVD, it was noted that Frank Iero, while joking about being "4'9"", didn't actually carry any weight of the casket, and that it rested on the other band members and their sixth pallbearer to carry the weight. Also noted was that the rain used in the sequence between the church and the hearse wasn't planned for, but the director used it to his advantage, as it set the mood of a funeral.

The video was nominated for five Moonmen at the 2005 MTV Video Music Awards: Best Rock Video, Best Choreography, Best New Artist, and the MTV2 and Viewer's Choice Awards (both of which are chosen by viewers). They lost to bands such as Green Day, Fall Out Boy, and The Killers. Though the band did not win any awards, they did do a surprise performance of the song towards the end of the show. They also won an MTV Video Music Awards Latin America "tongue" for the Best New Artist – International. They also won a Best Video award in the 2005 Kerrang! Awards. In November 2005, the video was nominated for two MTVU Woodie Awards (voted on by college students) and won the Woodie of the Year. In the Philippines, Helena has reached a cult-like status because of the popularity of alternative music.

The video was also voted number one by viewers of MTV Latinamerica in the 2005 "100 Most Wanted Videos" and was named the seventeenth best music video of the 21st century since 2000 by Billboard on July 24, 2018.

The video was uploaded to YouTube on October 22, 2006, and has garnered 180 million views as of March 2023.

Track listing

Credits and personnel
 Gerard Way – lead and backing vocals
 Ray Toro – rhythm guitar
 Frank Iero – lead guitar
 Mikey Way – bass guitar
 Matt Pelissier – drums, percussion, bells
 Howard Benson – 1958 Hammond B3

Charts

Certifications

Release history

References

2004 songs
My Chemical Romance songs
Music videos directed by Marc Webb
Songs written by Gerard Way
Song recordings produced by Howard Benson
2005 singles
Reprise Records singles
Songs about death
Gothic rock songs